Scaphopetalum is a genus previously classified under the plant family Sterculiaceae. Currently, under the APG IV system the genus is placed under the subfamily Byttnerioideae of the family Malvaceae senso lato. The distribution of the genus is restricted to the rain forests of Africa. In total 26 taxa have been described, 21 have been recognized (20 species and 1 variety), two invalid and one nomen nudus (without a formal description).

History
The genus Scaphopetalum was first described by Masters (1867), based on material from Equatorial Guinee (Mt.John) collected by Gustav Mann. Three species were described by Maxwell T. Masters, S. longe-penduculatum, S. blackii and S. mannii. Later, É. De Wildeman and T. Durant (June, 1897) described S. thonneri based on material collected by F. Thonner from northern DRC. A few months later K. Schumann (October, 1897) described four new species, S. stipulosum, S. macranthum, S. zenkeri and S. monophysca. The last species, S. monophysca closely resembles S. thonerii and its description is based on material from Cameroon and Gabon.

The next six new species are a contribution of German taxonomists mainly based on material from Cameroon collected by Ledermann, Mildbraed and Zenker. In 1908 H.Winkler describes S. paxii. collected by himself in Cameroon. Engler and Krause described two species in 1911, S. pallidinervis and  S. riparia and three in 1913, S. discolor, S. acuminatum and S. bruneo-purpureum. S. discolor is a species from Congo and the other four from Cameroon. That same year Baker f. described two species based on material collected by Talbot from Nigeria, S. parvifolium and S. talbotii.

The first species for West Africa was described by A. Chevalier in 1917 and named S. amoenum. For the Mayombe region (Gabon) two species were described by Pellegrine in 1921, S. letestui and S. ngounyense. The first species was made synonym by Halle in 1961 as a variety within S. blackii, S. blackii var. letestui. In the same publication N. Halle splits off another variety S. thonneri var. klainei. Both varieties were described without a prologue in Latin and subsequently invalid. In the same year R. Germain describes a new species S. vanderijstii and a new variety S. dewevrei var. suborophila  both for DRC. The most recent species is described from Equatorial Guinea, S. obiangianum by M.E. Leal in 2007.

Species
Scaphopetalum accuminatum Engl. & Krause (1913)
Scaphopetalum amoeum A.Chev. (1917)
Scaphopetalum blackii Mast. (1869)
Scaphopetalum blackii var. letestui (Pellegr.) N.Halle (1961) invalid
Scaphopetalum bruneopurpureum Engl.& Krause (1913)
Scaphopetalum dewevrei Dewild.& Th.Dur. (1900)
Scaphopetalum discolor Engl.& Krause (1913)
Scaphopetalum letestui Pellegr. (1921) synoniem
Scaphopetalum longepedunculatum Mast. (1869)
Scaphopetalum macranthum K.Schum. (1900)
Scaphopetalum mannii Mast.] (1869)
Scaphopetalum monophysca K.Schum. (1900) synoniem
Scaphopetalum ngouyense Pellegr. (1921)
Scaphopetalum obiangianum M.E.Leal (2007)
Scaphopetalum pallidinervis Engl.& Krause (1911)
Scaphopetalum parvifolium Baker f. (1913)
Scaphopetalum paxii H.Winkl. (1908)
Scaphopetalum riparia Engl.& Krause (1911)
Scaphopetalum staudtii K. Schum. nomen nudus synomiem of Cola marsupium K.Schum.
Scaphopetalum stipulosum K.Schum. (1900)
Scaphopetalum talbotii Bak.f. (1913)
Scaphopetalum thonneri Dewild.& Th.Dur. (1897)
Scaphopetalum thonneri var. klainei Pierre ex N.Halle (1961) invalid
Scaphopetalum vanderystii R.Germain (1961)
Scaphopetalum dewevrei var. suborophylla R.Germain (1961)
Scaphopetalum zenkeri K.Schum. (1900)

References

Bibliography
Chevalier A. (1920)  Explorations Botaniques de Afrique Occidental Francais i: 85
De Wildeman & T. Durand (1897)  Bulletin Societe Royal Botanique Belgique xxxix. 97
Engler  & K. Krause (1912) Botanisch Jahrbucher (sys)  xlviii: 553

 
Malvaceae genera
Taxonomy articles created by Polbot